Dig is the fourth album by alternative rock band Adam Again.

The album was remastered and repackaged in 2015 by Lo-Fidelity Records. The reissue included both CD and vinyl formats.

Track listing
All lyrics by Gene Eugene. All music by Gene Eugene except where noted.

"Deep" (Music: Eugene, Greg Lawless, John Knox) – 4:17
"It Is What It Is (What It Is)" (Music: Eugene, Lawless) – 3:43
"Dig" – 3:26
"Hopeless, Etc." – 4:53
"Songwork" (Music: Eugene, Lawless) – 5:29
"Worldwide" – 2:07
"Walk Between the Raindrops" – 3:31
"Hidden, Hidden" – 3:26
"River on Fire" – 5:46
"So Long" (Music: Eugene, Lawless, Knox) – 4:20

Personnel 

Adam Again
 Riki Michele – vocals 
 Gene Eugene – vocals, Rhodes piano, guitars 
 Greg Lawless – guitars
 Paul Valadez – bass 
 John Knox – drums

with:
 Rob Watson – keyboards (9), cello arrangements (9)
 David Raven – drums (4)
 Sarah Fiene – cello (9)

Production
 Gene Eugene – executive producer, producer, recording 
 Ojo Taylor – executive producer
 Adam Again – additional production 
 Brian Gardner – mastering at Bernie Grundman Mastering (Hollywood, California)
 Anna Cardenas – art direction, design, photography

References

1992 albums